Eric Andersen (born 1943) is an American folk music singer-songwriter.

Eric Andersen may also refer to:

 Eric Andersen (footballer) (1904–1977), Australian rules footballer
 Eric Andersen (artist) (born 1940), Danish artist

See also
 Eric Anderson (disambiguation)
 Erik Andersen (disambiguation)